teTeX (stylised as teTeX) was a TeX distribution for Unix-like systems. As of May 2006, teTeX is no longer actively maintained and its former maintainer Thomas Esser recommended TeX Live as the replacement.

The teTeX package is available as a package for system architectures:
 Linux (x86, SPARC, PowerPC, Alpha)
 macOS (x86, PowerPC)
 Solaris (x86, SPARC)

Other supported operating systems include:
 OpenBSD and FreeBSD (on x86 architectures)
 IBM AIX on (RS/6000)
 HP-UX (on HPPA)
 Microsoft Windows (on 32-bit systems)
 BeOS (for Intel x86)

History 
Thomas Esser maintained teTeX from 1994 until May, 2006. According to Esser, the time taken to package each successive release took longer than the previous. It has been superseded by TeX Live, a “comprehensive TeX system for most types of Unix, including Linux and Mac OS X, and also Windows”.  The goals of the teTeX project were to be easy, use free software, be well-documented, avoiding bugs along the way.

References

External links
 teTeX home page
 TeX newsgroup
 teTeX Documentation
 teTeX FAQ

Free TeX software